The 1998 Tipperary Senior Hurling Championship was the 108th staging of the Tipperary Senior Hurling Championship since its establishment by the Tipperary County Board in 1887. The championship began on 27 September 1998 and ended on 1 November 1998.

Clonoulty-Rossmore were the defending champions.

On 1 November 1998, Toomevara won the championship after a 0-16 to 1-10 defeat of Clonoulty-Rossmore in the final at Semple Stadium. It was their 14th championship title overall and their first title since 1994.

Results

Quarter-finals

Semi-finals

Final

Championship statistics

Top scorers

Top scorers overall

Top scorers in a single game

References

External link

 The Nenagh Co-op County Senior Hurling Championship - 1998

Tipperary
Tipperary Senior Hurling Championship